Maple Township is a township in Dickey County, in the U.S. state of North Dakota.

History
Maple Township took its name from the Maple River.

References

Townships in Dickey County, North Dakota
Townships in North Dakota